Dessie Finnegan is a Gaelic football player who played for the Louth inter-county team and St Patrick's GFC of  Lordship, County Louth. He won a National Football League Division 3 medal in 2011. His older brother Ray Finnegan was also a member of the Louth senior football team.

He is played in the full-back position, and was a member of the Louth team that contested the Leinster trophy in 2010.

Honours

Tommy Murphy Cup (1): 2006
National Football League, Division 2 (1): 2006
National Football League, Division 3 (1): 2011
Louth Senior Football Championship (6): 2003, 2004, 2007, 2011, 2012, 2014, 2015
Cardinal O'Donnell Cup (4):
Sheelan Cup (1):

References

1984 births
Living people
Irish plumbers
Louth inter-county Gaelic footballers
St Patrick's Lordship footballers